Keshwada is a small provincial state near Rajkot, Gujarat, which was one of the many states ruled by Ra Naghan the forefather of the clans of Chudasama, Sarvaiya, and Raijada.

References

Villages in Rajkot district